Rodon was a rock and pop music venue (club) in Athens, Greece, from 1987 to 2005; it was in 24 Marni Street.

Overview
The club was known for live performances (gigs) from Greek and foreign bands and individual performers such as Iggy Pop, Ramones,  Xylina Spathia and Trypes. Moreover, some albums were recorded live at Rodon.

The 2004 Athens Time Out guide mentions the club as Rodon 24 and writes about it: "The oldest rock club in Athens (and for a long time the only one) ... The name alone brings tears to the eyes of the average Athenian concert goer."

Artists and groups that performed live at Rodon
The following performed live at the club:
Motörhead (1990)
 King Diamond (25 February 1990)
Dio (4, 5, 6 November 1993)
Iced Earth (23, 24 January 1999)
Pixies (19 May 1989)
Iggy Pop  (9 February 1991)
John Cipollina
The Last Drive (December 1987, April 1988, February 1995)
Nick Cave (3, 4, 5 May 1989)
Nick Gravenites
Ramones (13 May 1989)
Ramones (7 May 1993)
Sonic Youth (13 February 1999)
Thin White Rope (5 October 1991)
Trypes
Xylina Spathia
Blackfield (27 November 2004)
Hi-5 (Greek band)
 Yngwie Malmsteen (November 1995)
 Porcupine Tree (26 October 1996)

Albums recorded live at Rodon
The following albums were recorded live at the club:

Live In Athens At The Rodon (1991) by Nick Gravenites and John Cipollina
 Alive in Athens (1999) by Iced Earth
 Blitzkrieg in Athens (1989) by Ramones
 Visions of Europe (1997) by Stratovarius

References

External links
  Rodon on  last.fm
 Athens Guide
 Last.fm website

1987 establishments in Greece
2005 disestablishments in Greece
Buildings and structures in Athens
Music in Athens
Music venues in Greece
Tourist attractions in Athens